"Crazy Over You" is a debut song recorded by American country music duo Foster & Lloyd, who also wrote the song.  It was released in May 1987 as the first single from their self-titled debut album.  It was their most successful single, peaking at #4 on the Billboard Hot Country Songs chart in 1987.  The song was simultaneously recorded and released by Ricky Van Shelton on his debut album, Wild-Eyed Dream.

Chart performance

References

1987 debut singles
1987 songs
Ricky Van Shelton songs
Foster & Lloyd songs
Songs written by Radney Foster
RCA Records singles
Songs written by Bill Lloyd (country musician)